Basin (originally Helveston) is an unincorporated community in George County, Mississippi, United States. Prior to the creation of George County, Basin was located in Jackson County.

A post office operated under the name Basin from 1887 to 1922.

The Basin soil series is named for the community.

References

Unincorporated communities in George County, Mississippi
Gulfport–Biloxi metropolitan area
Unincorporated communities in Mississippi